Banzai is a town in Pinghe County in the south of Fujian province, China. It lies on the Huashan River about 40 minutes' drive from the county seat of Xiaoxi.

Culture & Tourism
The town is known as the boyhood home of 20th Century bilingual author and Renaissance man Lin Yutang.

References

Township-level divisions of Fujian
Zhangzhou